Pyar Ki Kahani is a 1971 Indian Hindi-language romantic drama film directed by Ravikant Nagaich. It is a remake of the 1964 Tamil film Kai Kodutha Deivam. The film stars Amitabh Bachchan and Tanuja. The movie bombed and is one of the 11 consecutive flops of Amitabh Bachchan.

Plot 

Although well qualified, Ram Chand (Amitabh Bachchan) is unable to obtain suitable employment, and works as a peon in an organization. One day, he meets with Ravi Chand (Anil Dhawan), who is on the verge of committing suicide, he counsels him against this, as well as permitting him to live with him. Ravi gets employed in the same office as Ram, albeit as a Manager, and falls in love and marries a co-worker named Lata (Farida Jalal). Ram's parents would like him to get married too, and he goes to see them and meets his bride-to-be, Kusum Sharma (Tanuja). Ram sends a photograph of Kusum for approval to Ravi and Lata, and is disappointed to learn that Ravi does not approve of Kusum. When Ram attempts to find out the reason behind his disapproval, Ravi gives very elusive responses, and Ram takes it upon himself to find out why Ravi disapproves of Kusum so much. It is then Ram will come to know of the shocking truth behind the relationship between Kusum and Ravi, and about Kusum's reputation.

Cast 
Amitabh Bachchan as Ram
Tanuja as Kusum Sharma
Farida Jalal as Lata
Anil Dhawan as Ravi
Bipin Gupta as Mahadev Sharma
Madhu Chanda as Shakuntala Sharma
Agha as  Advocate N. Prasad
Prem Chopra as Banke
Mukri as Banke's Party Member
Mohan Choti as Banke's Party Member
Birbal as Banke's Party Member
Yunus Parvez as Gulabchand (Ram's Father)
Praveen Paul as Ram's Mother

Production 
The lead role was initially given to Jeetendra, but because of the film industry's imposed limit of a maximum of 6 films to be done as a leading role by an actor, Jeetendra had to give up this film as he was shooting for 6 films that year; the role went to Amitabh Bachchan.

Soundtrack 

"Koyi Aur Duniya Mein Tumsa" – Mohammad Rafi
"Ek Pate Ki Baat Bataoon Sun" – Mohammad Rafi
"Baby Tu Chhoti Hai" – Lata Mangeshkar, Usha Mangeshkar
"Ek Khabar Aayi Suno" – Kishore Kumar, Lata Mangeshkar
"Gori O Gori, Chori Ho Chori, Mera Jiya Le Gayi Chakori" – Kishore Kumar

References

External links 
 

1970s Hindi-language films
1971 films
1971 romantic drama films
Films directed by Ravikant Nagaich
Films scored by R. D. Burman
Hindi remakes of Tamil films
Indian romantic drama films